The Gov. John W. Martin House (also known as Apalachee) is a historic house in Tallahassee, Florida. The residence of governor John W. Martin, it is located within the borders of DeSoto Site Historic State Park. On January 6, 1986, it was added to the U.S. National Register of Historic Places.

See also
 Anhaica
 DeSoto Site Historic State Park
 List of sites and peoples visited by the Hernando de Soto Expedition

References

External links

 Leon County listings at National Register of Historic Places
 Florida's Office of Cultural and Historical Programs
 Leon County listings
 Governor John W. Martin House

Houses on the National Register of Historic Places in Florida
National Register of Historic Places in Tallahassee, Florida
History of Tallahassee, Florida
Houses in Tallahassee, Florida
Georgian Revival architecture in Florida